= Tour d'Afrique =

Tour d'Afrique is one of the longest bicycle expeditions in the world. It is organised by TDA Global Cycling, a Canadian company based in Toronto. It runs each year from January to May, from Cairo to Cape Town. The participants are expedition riders who cover each day at their own pace, stopping in the villages and roadside cafes. There are about 20 rest days. The organisers prepare three meals every day and transport tents and other equipment the riders need for the night stops.

The 2003 Tour d'Afrique set a Guinness World Record for fastest crossing of Africa by bicycle and this was achieved by nine participants of the race, Michael Kennedy, Chris Evans, Dave Genders (all from the United Kingdom), Paul Reynaert (Belgium), Jeremy Wex, Steve Topham, Scotty Robinson, Andrew Griffin (all from Canada) and Sascha Hartl (Austria). The 2008 Tour d'Afrique did not cross Kenya due to the political situation and reported violence.

The race component of the Tour d'Afrique was suspended after 2017, with the event continuing as an annual cycling expedition.

== Historical Race Results ==
Start	km	Finish	Winner	First female	Countries on route
2003-01-18	10 967	2003-05-18	Sascha Hartl, Austria	Marie-Claude Baehler, Switzerland	Egypt, Sudan, Ethiopia, Kenya, Tanzania, Malawi, Mozambique, Zimbabwe, Botswana, South Africa
2004-01-17	11 750	2004-05-15	Rob Van der Geest, Netherlands	Sandra Simon, Austria	Egypt, Sudan, Ethiopia, Kenya, Tanzania, Malawi, Zambia, Botswana, Namibia, South Africa
2005-01-15	11 786	2005-05-15	Kim Bremer, Denmark	Francziska Morger, Switzerland	Egypt, Sudan, Ethiopia, Kenya, Tanzania, Malawi, Zambia, Botswana, Namibia, South Africa
2006-01-14	11 900	2006-05-13	Matt Caretti, United States	Joan Louwrens, South Africa	Egypt, Sudan, Ethiopia, Kenya, Tanzania, Malawi, Zambia, Botswana, Namibia, South Africa
2007-01-13	11 900	2007-05-12	Adrie Frijters, Netherlands	Eva Nijssen, Netherlands	Egypt, Sudan, Ethiopia, Kenya, Tanzania, Malawi, Zambia, Botswana, Namibia, South Africa
2008-01-12	10 700	2008-05-10	Jos Kaal, Netherlands	Deb Corbeil, Canada	Egypt, Sudan, Ethiopia, Tanzania, Malawi, Zambia, Botswana, Namibia, South Africa
2009-01-10	11 777	2009-05-09	Allan Benn, South Africa	Taryn Laurie, South Africa	Egypt, Sudan, Ethiopia, Kenya, Tanzania, Malawi, Zambia, Botswana, Namibia, South Africa
2010-01-10	11 844	2010-05-15	Stuart Briggs, Australia	Gisela Gartmair, Germany	Egypt, Sudan, Ethiopia, Kenya, Tanzania, Malawi, Zambia, Botswana, Namibia, South Africa
2011-01-15	11 718	2011-05-14	Paul Wolfe, Canada	Tori Fahey, Canada	Egypt, Sudan, Ethiopia, Kenya, Tanzania, Malawi, Zambia, Botswana, Namibia, South Africa
2012-01-14	11 693	2012-05-12	Christian Sailer, Switzerland	Femke Nelissen, Netherlands	Egypt, Sudan, Ethiopia, Kenya, Tanzania, Malawi, Zambia, Botswana, Namibia, South Africa
2013-01-11	11 718	2013-05-11	Pascal Duquette, Canada	Bridget O'Meara, South Africa	Egypt, Sudan, Ethiopia, Kenya, Tanzania, Malawi, Zambia, Botswana, Namibia, South Africa
2014-01-10	11 781	2014-05-10	David Grosshans, Australia	Ina de Visser, Netherlands	Sudan, Ethiopia, Kenya, Tanzania, Malawi, Zambia, Botswana, Namibia, South Africa
2015-01-09	11 781	2015-05-09	Mike Lantz, United States	Sue Shuttleworth, United Kingdom	Egypt, Sudan, Ethiopia, Kenya, Tanzania, Malawi, Zambia, Botswana, Namibia, South Africa
2016-01-15	11 387	2016-05-14	Douwe Cunningham, Netherlands	Katja Steenkamp, South Africa	Egypt, Sudan, Ethiopia, Kenya, Tanzania, Malawi, Zambia, Botswana, Namibia, South Africa
2017-01-13	11 183	2017-05-13	Charles Butler, Australia	Alexandra Pastollnigg, Austria	Egypt, Sudan, Kenya, Uganda, Rwanda, Tanzania, Malawi, Zambia, Botswana, Namibia, South Africa

== Literature ==
Hardy Grüne: Tour d'Afrique: 12 000 Kilometer Radrennen von Kairo nach Kapstadt, 2011
